Mangaweka railway station was a station on the North Island Main Trunk, serving the village of Mangaweka in the Manawatū-Whanganui region of New Zealand. The original station opened in 1902 and closed on 15 November 1981. A new station then opened to the east, on the Mangaweka deviation on 18 November 1981, though only for parcels, small lots, and as a passing loop, which still remains.

The station was important as the terminus of the line from Wellington from 1902 to 1904.

History 
An advert for timber for the station building was placed on 13 December 1901. Dates from 3 July to 30 August 1902 are mentioned for opening goods traffic to Mangaweka and 30 October for inspection of the  line from Mangaonoho to Mangaweka. On 1 November 1904 a cart approach and crane were also mentioned and a warehouse crane and stockyard upgrade came in 1913.

Dates for the extension northwards are also varied. 9 June to 4 August 1904 are given for when the  extension from Mangaweka to Utiku opened for goods. Passenger trains started running to Taihape on Friday, 12 August 1904, though it wasn't until Tuesday, 1 November 1904 when NZR took over the  Mangaweka to Taihape section.

In 1957 the passing loop was extended and motor points and colour light signals installed.

When passenger trains stopped calling from Sunday, 18 April 1971, much of the station building had been demolished, though in 1980 a station building, goods shed, loading bank, and 1½ ton crane remained. A new station opened on Wednesday, 18 November 1981, but closed before 1993.

Incidents 
A slip derailed a locomotive at the entrance to the tunnel in 1913. A goods train derailed, breaking several trucks and some track, in a cutting on the Mangaweka side of Mangaweka Viaduct in 1930.

References

Defunct railway stations in New Zealand
Buildings and structures in Manawatū-Whanganui
Rail transport in Manawatū-Whanganui
Railway stations opened in 1902
Railway stations closed in 1981